The 2020–21 season was the 110th season in the existence of Brescia Calcio and the club's first season back in the second division of Italian football. In addition to the domestic league, Brescia participated in this season's edition of the Coppa Italia.

Players

First-team squad

Other players under contract

Out on loan

Transfers

In

Out

Pre-season and friendlies

Competitions

Overall record

Serie B

League table

Results summary

Results by round

Matches
The league fixtures were announced on 9 September 2020.

Promotion play-offs

Coppa Italia

References

Brescia Calcio seasons
Brescia